Isilkul is a town in Omsk Oblast, Russia, located  west of Omsk, the administrative center of the oblast. Population:

Etymology
The name of the town is Kazakh, with "Esil" being the Kazakh name for the Ishim River and "köl" meaning 'lake'.

Administrative and municipal status
Within the framework of administrative divisions, Isilkul serves as the administrative center of Isilkulsky District, even though it is not a part of it. As an administrative division, it is incorporated separately as the town of oblast significance of Isilkul—an administrative unit with the status equal to that of the districts. As a municipal division, the town of oblast significance of Isilkul is incorporated within Isilkusky Municipal District as Isilkul Urban Settlement.

Transportation
The town is a transfer point on the southern branch of the Trans-Siberian Railway between the Western Siberian and Sverdlovsk railroads.

Notable residents 

Igor Albin (born 1966), politician
Sergey  Shelpakov (born 1956), Soviet Olympic cyclist

References

Notes

Sources

External links
Official website of Isilkul 
Isilkul Business Directory 

Cities and towns in Omsk Oblast